The Zion Church in Brownsville, Tennessee, United States, also known as Christ Episcopal Church, is a historic church at College and Washington Streets which was built during 1854 to c.1869.  It was added to the National Register in 1978.

It is a brick Gothic Revival-style church designed by the Reverend James W. Rogers, who led a fund-raising drive that raised $3,200 for construction.

The Zion Church was organized in Brownsville in 1832 by Reverend John Chilton, who was the first Episcopal priest ordained in Tennessee, and by Reverend Thomas Wright.  The congregation worshiped in the Haywood County Courthouse until construction of this church began in 1854.  The church was largely completed in 1857 or 1858;  its tower was built, and its altar and lectern were installed, in 1868 or 1869.  The church was consecrated at Zion Church was consecrated on March 15, 1874. Its name was changed to Christ Church in 1898.

References

Episcopal churches in Tennessee
Churches on the National Register of Historic Places in Tennessee
Gothic Revival church buildings in Tennessee
Churches completed in 1854
Churches in Haywood County, Tennessee
19th-century Episcopal church buildings
National Register of Historic Places in Haywood County, Tennessee